The commune of Nyabihanga is a commune of Mwaro Province in central Burundi. The capital lies at Nyabihanga.

References

Communes of Burundi
Mwaro Province